In Syria, the production and distribution of beer was controlled by the government, and most widely sold through the army's Military Social Establishment supermarket chain and through mini markets in city centres and Christian as well as Muslim areas. Beers imported from Lebanon are not common, although brands like Lebanese Almaza, Heineken and Amstel are popular and available in hotels, restaurants and most shops in different parts of cities like Damascus, Aleppo, Latakia, Tartus and Qamishli. Production of the country's two local brands, al-Shark (from Aleppo) and Barada (from Damascus) was halted in 2011 due to the outbreak of civil war. A new brewery known as Afamia was opened in 2010 in Adra near Damascus. By the end of 2017, the Arados brewery was opened in the town of Safita in Tartus Governorate.

Beer brands and brewing companies

Al-Shark Beer, (or al-Chark) is a product of the state-owned Al-Shark Company for Food Stuff Products in Aleppo. It was founded in 1954 and fully owned by the government of Syria. It is a pale lager beer, slightly higher in alcohol (3.7%) and with a higher rating than Barada beer, and it had a medium malt body.
Barada Beer, is a product of the state-owned Barada Beer Company in Damascus. It was founded in 1977 and fully owned by the government of Syria. It is a pale lager beer with the quality of bottling being highly variable and frequently poor. It had 3.4% alcohol, a yellowish hazy color and a light body. Government produced Barada was notorious for its poor quality and stale taste.
Afamia Beer of Syria, founded in 2010 and launched in 2017 by Afamia Beverages Company; Afamia brewing facility is located in Adra Industrial Zone, at the northeastern suburbs of the capital Damascus. Afamia brewery has invested in state-of-the-art equipment and technology along with European expertise and raw material to produce Syria's first premium beer with 4.5% alcohol by volume in brown bottle and Blue label. Afamia also produces Afamia Extra Strong with 8.5% alcohol by volume in a brown bottle and Red label.
Arados Beer, launched in 2017 by the Arados brewing factory in Safita, Tartus Governorate, with the help of experts from the Czech Republic. It is the latest company for beer production in Syria, with an investment of US$16 million, and with plans to produce 15 million liters per year. Arados brewery of Safita represents the first mass-produced domestic beer since production of al-Shark and Barada ceased, following the outbreak of the civil war in Syria.

Ancient history
The Ebla tablets, discovered in 1974 in Ebla, Syria, and presumed to go back to 2500 BC, reveal that the city produced a variety of beers, including one that appears to have been named after the city "Ebla".

See also

 Beer and breweries by region

References

External links
 Afamia Beer of Syria
 Syrian breweries
 Barada beer

 
Syrian cuisine